"Down by the Old Mill Stream" is a song written by Tell Taylor.  It was one of the most popular songs of the early 20th century.  The publisher, Forster Music Publisher, Inc., sold 4 million copies.

Background
The song was written in 1908 while Taylor was sitting on the banks of the Blanchard River in Findlay, Ohio.  Reportedly, Taylor's friends persuaded him not to publish the song, believing it had no commercial value.  In 1910 the song was published and introduced to the public with performances by the vaudeville quartet The Orpheus Comedy Four.  After the group performed the song at a Woolworth store in Kansas City it became so popular that the store sold all 1,000 copies of the sheet music Taylor had brought with him.  Since then over four million copies of its sheet music have been sold and it has become a staple for barbershop quartets.

Recordings
Early popular recordings were by Arthur Clough (1911) and by Harry Macdonough (1912).
Bing Crosby recorded the song on March 15, 1939 with John Scott Trotter's Frying Pan Five. The Mills Brothers included the song in their album Greatest Barbershop Hits (1959). Harry James recorded a version in 1965 on his album Harry James Plays Green Onions & Other Great Hits (Dot DLP 3634 and DLP 25634).

Lyrics

Popular culture
In the 1929 Columbia cartoon Farm Relief, Krazy and some animals sing "Down by the Old Mill Stream" after drinking some spirits.

Groucho and Chico Marx sing the tune a capella as they “scrub up” while posing as doctors in a scene in 1937’s ‘’A Day at the Races’’.

In the middle section of his song "We Will All Go Together When We Go," Tom Lehrer parodied "Down By the Old Mill Stream" with a stride piano, singing the following words in reference to a nuclear holocaust:  "Down by the old Mael-strom/ There'll be a storm before the Calm."

In a 1958 episode of The Danny Thomas Show, called "Jack Benny Takes Danny's Job," comedian Jack Benny sings the song, with added lyrics, as part of a Cub Scouts show.

Alvin and the Chipmunks covered the song for their 1965 album The Chipmunks Sing with Children.  They also performed the song as both the prologue and the epilogue for their 1982 album Chipmunk Rock.

In It's the Pied Piper, Charlie Brown, Snoopy (as the Pied Piper) plays the song on his concertina to lure the Mayor and his city council away from the city hall and they then sing the song.

Redd Foxx and LaWanda Page sing a duet version of "Down By The Old Mill Stream" in the Sanford and Son episode "My Fair Esther".

In an episode of All in the Family, Edith, Mike and Gloria wake up Archie singing this song.

Sheila Florence as Lizzie Birdsworth sings the chorus of "Down By The Old Mill Stream" in Episode 295 of the Australian TV series Prisoner in 1982. In the scene Lizzie who is in her cell and is drunk has been given a bottle of whiskey by prison officer Joan Ferguson in exchange for information.

In the 2014 video game "Skylanders: Trap Team, during Pain-Yatta's villain quest, the Gecko Chorus can be heard singing "Down by the Old Mill Stream"

See also 
 List of best-selling sheet music

References

Bibliography
Taylor, Tell. "Down By The Old Mill Stream" (Sheet music). Chicago: Star Music Pub. (1910)

External links
"Down By The Old Mill Stream", Arthur C. Clough (Edison Amberol 796, 1911)—Cylinder Preservation and Digitization Project.

Songs about rivers
1908 songs
1900s song stubs
Vaudeville songs
American pop songs